Norm Stokes (16 November 1909 – 31 December 2004) was a New Zealand cricketer. He played in four first-class matches for Canterbury from 1937 to 1939.

See also
 List of Canterbury representative cricketers

References

External links
 

1909 births
2004 deaths
New Zealand cricketers
Canterbury cricketers
Cricketers from Christchurch